The 1976 NBA World Championship Series was the championship round for the National Basketball Association (NBA)'s 1975–76 season, and the culmination of the season's playoffs. The Eastern Conference champion Boston Celtics defeated the Western Conference champion Phoenix Suns 4 games to 2 to win their 13th NBA Championship. Celtics point guard Jo Jo White was named as the series MVP.

Background

Phoenix Suns

The Phoenix Suns entered the NBA as an expansion team in the 1968–69 season. Prior to 1976, they only made the playoffs once, losing to the Los Angeles Lakers in the first round of the 1970 NBA Playoffs. Before that the Suns lost a coin flip to the Milwaukee Bucks to determine the fate of Kareem Abdul-Jabbar's new team prior to the 1969 NBA draft. Phoenix ultimately selected Neal Walk, who became a bust. The Suns redeemed themselves in the 1975 NBA draft by selecting Alvan Adams fourth overall.

With Adams fortifying the center position, and with new addition Paul Westphal and Dick Van Arsdale providing the scoring punch, the Suns reached the playoffs for only the second time, finishing with 42 wins. The Suns defeated the Seattle SuperSonics in six games of the conference semifinals, before achieving a major upset in dethroning the previous year's champions the Golden State Warriors in seven games. The Suns made it to their first NBA Finals.

Boston Celtics

The Boston Celtics were seeking to make up for the lost opportunity they squandered in the 1975 NBA Playoffs. That year, they finished with 60 wins, but lost to the Washington Bullets in the conference finals. They kept the core of the team that won the 1974 NBA Finals, but made some tweaks, such as the trade of Westphal to Phoenix for Charlie Scott. The Celtics won 54 games in the 1975–76 season, then defeated the Buffalo Braves and the "Miracle of Richfield" Cleveland Cavaliers in six games each to reach their 14th NBA Finals. Boston was seeking its 13th NBA title.

Road to the Finals

Regular season series
Boston swept the four-game regular season series.

Series summary

Boston Celtics defeated Phoenix Suns, 4–2

Game 1
Boston turned back the Suns in game one behind a balanced attack. John Havlicek did not start for the Celtics due to a painful heel injury. However, Boston coach Tom Heinsohn rushed Havlicek into the game with 7:24 left in the first quarter as Phoenix took an early 10–7 lead and the Ohio State product never came back out of the game. Dave Cowens recorded a triple-double with 25 points, 21 rebounds and 10 assists while Jo Jo White shot only 1–4 from the field in the first half before making 8-of-11 shots in the second half to keep Phoenix at bay. Phoenix trailed by two at the end of the first quarter as they failed to take advantage of 11 first quarter Celtic turnovers. Kevin Stacom scored five straight points (his only points) to put Boston up for good 22–20. Charlie Scott fouled out when he picked up his fifth and sixth fouls in an 11-second span.

Game 2
Phoenix lost their twelfth game in a row at Boston Garden as Boston put the game away with a 20–2 run at the start of the third quarter that gave them a 72–43 lead. The run was started by steals from Jo Jo White and Charlie Scott. Scott made just one-of-nine shots from the field in the first half but came alive with 12 points in the third quarter. Boston again started the game slowly without John Havlicek in the starting line-up, not making a field goal in the first three minutes of the game and again prompting Tommy Heinsohn to rush Havlicek into the game again.

Game 3

Phoenix held Boston scoreless for nearly five minutes in the second period as they went to a 16-point lead. Then, the Suns' Ricky Sobers and Boston's Kevin Stacom got into a fistfight, and both were ejected. Sobers was having a good game at that point, and Phoenix coach John MacLeod would later accuse the Celtics of having Stacom bait Sobers into the fight in order to get him out of the game.

The Suns extended the lead to 23 in the third, but Boston began to charge back and cut the lead to two with three minutes left. At that point, Suns rookie center Alvan Adams scored twice, passed off to Paul Westphal for another, and then tipped in a Westphal miss moments later.

That was enough to get Phoenix a 105–98 win. Adams finished with 33 points and 14 rebounds. Dave Cowens and Charlie Scott both fouled out for the Celtics, and the Celtics also were whistled for two technicals.

Game 4
In the first-ever NBA game played in the month of June, referees Don Murphy and Manny Sokol whistled 21 fouls in the first 10 minutes. Celtics coach Tom Heinsohn claimed later that the affair was pure "high school." John Havlicek and Cowens put the blame on their team for 'committing stupid fouls.'

The game was close to the end, when Ricky Sobers hit a bank shot to put the Suns up by four with 90 seconds left. The Celtics cut it to two and had a chance to tie it, but lost 109-107 when Jo Jo White missed a jump shot late.

Game 5

Game 5 was a triple-overtime contest that is sometimes referred to as "the greatest game ever played" in NBA history. The Celtics surged out to a 36-18 lead after one quarter and led 42-20 early in the second, with John Havlicek (starting for the first time all series) scoring 19 of his team's points.  The halftime lead was 61-45 Celtics, but the Suns began to claw back and held Havlicek scoreless until near the end of regulation. 

The game was enhanced by several controversies.  Two controversies involved each team's use of timeouts:

Another set of controversies involved the clock:

The most notable portion of the game was the final 20 seconds of the second overtime. Boston led at that point 109–106 (with the three-point basket not yet in existence). Phoenix had possession of the ball after taking its last timeout of the OT. In an amazing and frantic sequence, the following transpired:

Phoenix suddenly led, 110–109, with just five seconds left, and the team looked poised to win their third straight game and grab a 3-to-2 edge in the series. John Havlicek (already of "Havlicek Stole the Ball" fame) responded with a drive and a leaning one-hander in traffic, that he banked in off the glass (his first basket since the first quarter), putting Boston in front 111–110 as the horn sounded. The fans then poured onto the court to celebrate Boston's apparent victory. The Celtics returned to their locker room. As CBS analyst Rick Barry passionately and correctly pointed out, the ball went through the hoop with two seconds left and the clock should have been stopped. The officials apparently agreed with Barry and ordered the Celtics back onto the floor. The game was not over.

During the ensuing pandemonium, a fan attacked referee Richie Powers and other fans turned over one of the scorer's tables. After clearing the court (the fan who attacked Powers was arrested and the fans who overturned the scorer's table were ejected) and getting the Celtics back on the floor, the officials put one second back on the clock. Still, Phoenix's chances seemed slim, as they had the ball under their own basket with a second left. Then Paul Westphal of the Suns signaled for a time out that the Suns did not have. Although this resulted in a technical foul being called on Westphal, the play was critical for Phoenix, because the rules at the time gave Phoenix the same advantage (save for the technical foul shot) that they would have had with timeouts remaining to use; namely, possession of the ball at half court. Boston's Jo Jo White made the technical free throw, increasing Boston's lead to 112–110.

During the timeout, fans were still on the Boston Garden floor, even disturbing the Suns' huddle by their bench as coach John MacLeod was drawing up a play for a possible tying basket. The Suns' players repeatedly had to shove the fans out of the way, and Phoenix general manager Jerry Colangelo even threatened to not bring his team back to the Boston Garden for Game 7 if security couldn't maintain control. When play resumed, Phoenix's Gar Heard took the inbounds pass from Perry and made a buzzer-beating shot (a turn-around jumper at the top of the key) for the Suns that tied the score yet again, 112–112.

Boston eventually took a six-point lead, 128–122, late in the third overtime, as Glenn McDonald, a little-used Celtic reserve player, chipped in half a dozen. Westphal then scored the next four points for Phoenix (as part of a brilliant performance that featured several leaping, spinning, acrobatic bank shots) cutting the gap to 128–126, but he could not get the ball again; (although he very nearly did – almost stealing a pass near half court as the third overtime wound down).

Celtics who fouled out (were disqualified due to six personal fouls) were Charlie Scott in the last minute of regulation, Dave Cowens with one minute left in the 2nd overtime, and Paul Silas in the 3rd overtime. Alvan Adams and Dennis Awtrey both fouled out for the Suns. Silas picked up his fifth foul late in the fourth quarter, but played the entire remainder, including all three overtime periods before fouling out late in the third.

The Suns had the lead in the game on only four occasions (twice in the second overtime) and never by more than 2 points. They led 95–94 late in the fourth, and 106–105 and 110–109 in the 2nd overtime. They also led by two points on three occasions in the third overtime.

McDonald scored eight points in the game, all in overtime.

Jo Jo White led all scorers with 33 points.

Pat Riley was a reserve on the Suns' bench, but never played in a game.

Game 6
After the tough Game 5 loss, the Suns were more defiant than ever heading back home to Phoenix. "We know we're going to beat them." Gar Heard declared. "It's going to take seven now, but we know we're going to beat them. We showed we came to play."

The first half was a defensive struggle. Each team scored 20 points in the first quarter, then Boston scored 18 in the second while holding the Suns to 13. Keith Erickson, a key Suns' reserve, had attempted to play at the start of the second period, but reinjured his sprained ankle and never returned. After falling behind by 11, Phoenix caught up again in the third and took a 67–66 lead on a Ricky Sobers free throw with 7:25 left in the game.

But the Celtic heroes of old (Dave Cowens, John Havlicek) and new (Charlie Scott) took control from there. Havlicek hit two free throws; then Cowens stole the ball, drove, scored, drew the foul and made the foul shot for a three-point play. Cowens then scored two baskets and Havlicek another to put it away. Scott had three steals during the run and finished with 25 points and 11 rebounds, ending a series-long 11-for-44 shooting slump.

During the run, Phoenix's only response was four free throws. The Celtics rode their surge to an 87–80 win and their 13th championship.

Jo Jo White scored 15 points, giving him 130 points in six games, and was named the series MVP. John Havlicek celebrated his eighth and final NBA title as a Celtic.

Television coverage
The 1975–76 Finals had three straight off days between Sunday afternoon opener and Thursday night second game due to CBS-TV's concern with low ratings for professional basketball. The 1975–76 network television season (as well as May sweeps) ended after Wednesday, May 26 (with weekend afternoon games not factored into the prime-time ratings). Accordingly, CBS-TV allowed Game One to be played on Sunday afternoon, since the ratings would not count, but would not permit Game Two to be played live in prime time unless the NBA waited until Thursday evening.

Game 3 started on Sunday, May 30 at 10:30 a.m. MST in order for CBS to televise the final round of the PGA Tour Memorial Tournament following the game. The move angered numerous clergy in the Phoenix area, who saw drastically reduced attendance at Sunday services. The game also happened to be on the same day as the Indianapolis 500, but live flag-to-flag coverage of the event by ABC Sports was still ten years away.

CBS play-by-play announcer Brent Musburger, in a Fall 2009 interview with ESPN, said that he and color announcer Rick Barry were rooting for Phoenix to win Games 3, 4 and 6, although Barry's Golden State Warriors were eliminated by the Suns in the Western Conference Finals. Musburger said that this was because he and Barry were paid by the game. Since the Series was 2-0 Boston after the first two games, Musburger and Barry wanted the Suns to win the next two games to tie the series (likewise with Game six). Typically, Boston fans, unaware of Musburger's and Barry's motivations, were upset with the announcing crew because of their perceived favoritism. (citation?)

Team rosters

Boston Celtics

Phoenix Suns
{| class="toccolours" style="font-size: 85%; width: 100%;"
|-
! colspan="2" style="background-color: #423189;  color: #FF8800; text-align: center;" | Phoenix Suns roster
|- style="background-color: #FF8800; color: #423189;   text-align: center;"
! Players !! Coaches
|-
| valign="top" |
{| class="sortable" style="background:transparent; margin:0px; width:100%;"
! Pos. !! # !! Nat. !! Name !! Height !! Weight !! DOB (Y-M-D) !! From
|-

Aftermath

Celtics
The championship was the 13th won by the Celtics, and they kept the original Walter A. Brown trophy through the 1976–77 season. During the season, the NBA commissioned a new championship trophy, later to be renamed the Larry O'Brien Championship Trophy, in which the winning team would keep the trophy permanently. 

Unfortunately, the Celtics were unable to successfully defend their championship, losing in the Eastern Conference semifinals to the eventual conference champion Philadelphia 76ers in seven games. After that, the team began to rebuild, losing John Havlicek to retirement and then Jo Jo White to a trade within two years. Despite drafting Larry Bird in the 1978 NBA draft, Bird elected to play out his final season in college while the Celtics lost 53 games in the 1978–79 season. With Bird debuting for the 1979–80 season, the Celtics won 32 more games, but it was not until  that they  won another championship.

Suns
The Suns followed their unexpected run to the Finals with a losing season in 1976–77, going 34–48. After the season, Dick Van Arsdale retired, alongside twin brother Tom who became his teammate for that season. However, the team would make the playoffs the next eight seasons, going as far as the conference finals in 1979 and 1984. 

Alvan Adams remained with the Suns for the next twelve seasons, retiring after the 1987–88 season. Paul Westphal played five more seasons in Phoenix, albeit in two different stints, before becoming a coach. Westphal would coach the Suns to the  finals in a losing effort. Pat Riley retired after the season and went on to win six NBA championships as a coach.

See also
1976 NBA Playoffs
1975–76 NBA season

References

External links
NBA History

National Basketball Association Finals
Finals
NBA
NBA
NBA Finals
NBA Finals
NBA Finals
Basketball competitions in Boston
Basketball competitions in Phoenix, Arizona
20th century in Phoenix, Arizona
NBA Finals
NBA Finals